"No Son of Mine" is a song by American rock band Foo Fighters. It was released as the second single from their tenth album Medicine at Midnight on January 1, 2021.

Composition

NME stated that the song features nods to "Stone Cold Crazy" by Queen and "Ace of Spades" by Motörhead.

Foo Fighters bassist Nate Mendel said that recording was "challenging" for him as the band approached things differently by "constructing things from the ground up" as opposed to their usual method of "recording them more live to tape and just kind of sitting in a room and playing."

Live performances

Along with single "Waiting on a War", Foo Fighters' first live performance of "No Son of Mine" was on Jimmy Kimmel Live! on January 14, 2021.

Music video

A live performance combined with animation was used to make the music video for the song. The live footage was filmed by Danny Clinch and the animation was made by Bomper Studio.

Charts

References

2020 songs
2021 singles
Foo Fighters songs
RCA Records singles
Songs written by Dave Grohl